William Evan James (15 March 1832 – 7 January 1896) was a Welsh Anglican priest.

James was born in Llandysul, educated at Jesus College, Oxford and  ordained  in 1856. After a curacy at St Peter's Church, Carmarthen, he was Principal of Carmarthen Trinity College. Later he was Vicar of Abergwili and Prebendary of Caerfarchell in St Davids Cathedral.

References

 

Alumni of Jesus College, Oxford
Archdeacons of Carmarthen
1832 births
1896 deaths
19th-century Welsh Anglican priests
People from Ceredigion